The 1891 Philadelphia mayoral election saw the election of Erwin Sydney Stuart.

Results

References

1891
Philadelphia
Philadelphia mayoral
19th century in Philadelphia